SIDM may refer to:
 Système intérimaire de drone MALE, now EADS Harfang
 self-interacting dark matter
 strongly interacting dark matter 
 Serial impact dot matrix, a dot matrix printing technology